Luís Pedro Alves Bastos (born 10 September 2001) is a Portuguese professional footballer who plays as a left-back for the club Paços de Ferreira.

Professional career
Bastos signed his first professional contract with Paços de Ferreira on 23 August 2020. He spent the 2020–21 season on loan with Felgueiras, before returning to the senior team of Paços de Ferreira. He made his professional debut with Paços de Ferreira in a 2-1 Taça da Liga loss to Boavista on 23 September 2021.

References

External links
 
 

2001 births
Living people
People from Paços de Ferreira
Portuguese footballers
F.C. Paços de Ferreira players
F.C. Felgueiras 1932 players
Primeira Liga players
Campeonato de Portugal (league) players
Association football fullbacks
Sportspeople from Porto District